Gerd Schwickert (born 14 August 1949) is a retired German football midfielder and later manager.

References

1949 births
Living people
German footballers
1. FSV Mainz 05 players
FC 08 Homburg players
Association football midfielders
2. Bundesliga players
German football managers
FC 08 Homburg managers
Borussia Neunkirchen managers
SV Eintracht Trier 05 managers
FC Augsburg managers
SV Wehen Wiesbaden managers
SV Elversberg managers
SV Alsenborn players